Prescott Park may refer to:

Prescott Park (New Hampshire), a park in Portsmouth, New Hampshire, United States
Prescott Park (Oregon), a park in Medford, Oregon, United States, that includes Roxy Ann Peak